Marlies Dekkers (born 29 November 1965 in Oosterhout) is a Dutch fashion designer known for her lingerie line Undressed.

Biography
She studied at the Art school in Breda, from which she graduated cum laude (with distinction) in 1991. With the aid of a government grant, she launched, two years later in 1993, her first collection of items under the fashion label Undressed, heralded at the time as a new approach to designing lingerie.

In 1996, Dekkers married Peter Wagenaar, a photographer. The couple have one daughter Zilver (Silver in Dutch). Wagenaar was also a member of the board of Marlies Dekkers' company. When the couple divorced in 2006, Wagenaar also left the company.

Points of sale
The Marlies Dekkers brand (stylized in print as "marlies|dekkers") is sold in 1000 Marlies Dekkers stores worldwide in cities such as Amsterdam, Rotterdam, Antwerp, Paris, Bangkok, Berlin, Moscow and Cologne.  A store was briefly opened in New York from December 2008 to March 2009. and in Utrecht at the end of 2008. The products are also sold on-line.

There are 4 additional locations that carry marlies|dekkers. The newest of these locations, Uplift Intimate Apparel, opened in 2017 in Carmel, Indiana, and carries a wide variety of her styles. In Salt Lake City, Utah, the BraBar|boutique, which opened in 2012, carries UNDRESSED and marlies|dekkers. Estilo established marlies|dekkers sales in 2009, and the Australasian relater Myer carries this brand.

Fashion lines
 Undressed Women (lingerie collection for women)
 Undressed Special Sizes (lingerie collection for curvy women)
 Undressed Girls (lingerie collection for young women)
 Undressed Men (modern underwear line for men)
 Undressed Cotton (never out of stock cotton line for both men and women)
 Undressed Secrets (vintage lingerie collection)
 Sundressed (beachwear & accessories)
 Sundressed Sunglasses (sunglasses)
 Nightdressed (luxurious lounge- and evening wear)

Awards
 Dutch Bodyfashion Award (1994)
 ELLE's Innovator of the Year Award (2004)
 Grand Seigneur (2005)
 Prix Veuve Clicquot Business woman of the year (2007)
 Cila Award – Best Fashion Lingerie (2007)
 Creator of the Year (2008)
 CILA Award – Best Maternity Lingerie (2008)
 Marie Claire Prix de la Mode (2008)

Public Collections
 Rijksmuseum Amsterdam

References

External links

 
 

1965 births
Dutch fashion designers
Dutch women fashion designers
Living people
People from Oosterhout
Lingerie brands
AKV St. Joost alumni